The Net is a 1952 thriller novel by the British writer John Pudney.

Synopsis
At an isolated, secret research centre a group of scientists work on a prototype new aircraft, but feel the strains of their tight confinement.

Film adaptation
In 1953 it was made into a British film of the same title directed by Anthony Asquith and starring James Donald, Phyllis Calvert and Herbert Lom.

References

Bibliography
 Goble, Alan. The Complete Index to Literary Sources in Film. Walter de Gruyter, 1999.
 Hammond, Andrew. Cold War Stories: British Dystopian Fiction, 1945-1990. Springer, 2017.
 Ryall, Tom. Anthony Asquith. Oxford University Press, 2013.

1952 British novels
British thriller novels
British mystery novels
British novels adapted into films
Michael Joseph books